The Nandi Award for Best Supporting Actor is an award presented at the Nandi Awards, instituted since 1981.

Winners

See also
 Nandi Awards
 Cinema of Andhra Pradesh

References

Supporting Actor